The Sharfadin temple in Sinjar, Iraq is an 800-year old Yazidi temple built in honor of Sheikh Sherfedin. It is considered by Yazidis as one of the holiest places on earth.

The temple is made of a pale yellow stone, with two cones atop the building. At the tip of each cone are three gold balls and a crescent reaching skyward.

In August 2014, the temple was the site of a battle where 18 lightly armed Yazidi Peshmerga fighters under the command of Qasim Shesho successfully held off a larger and better equipped ISIL force with armored vehicles, mortars, and rockets that had attacked the shrine as part of the Genocide of Yazidis by ISIL.

See also
List of Yazidi holy places

References

Yazidi holy places